Remo Fischer (born 13 August 1981 in Bäretswil) is a Swiss cross-country skier who has competed since 2000. He competed at the 2006 Winter Olympics in Turin, finishing 21st in the 50 km and 36th in the 15 km + 15 km double pursuit events.

At the FIS Nordic World Ski Championships, Fischer's best finish was seventh in the 4 × 10 km relay at Liberec in 2009 while he best individual finish was 16th in the 15 km event at Oberstdorf in 2005.

His best World Cup finish was third in the 50 km event at the Holmenkollen ski festival in 2008. Fischer has ten career victories from 10 km to 50 km at lesser events since 2004.

Fischer finished tenth in the 4 × 10 km relay at the 2010 Winter Olympics in Vancouver.

Cross-country skiing results
All results are sourced from the International Ski Federation (FIS).

Olympic Games

World Championships

World Cup

Season standings

Individual podiums
1 podium

Team podiums
 1 victory – (1 ) 
 1 podium – (1 )

References

External links
 

1981 births
Cross-country skiers at the 2006 Winter Olympics
Cross-country skiers at the 2010 Winter Olympics
Cross-country skiers at the 2014 Winter Olympics
Living people
Olympic cross-country skiers of Switzerland
Swiss male cross-country skiers
Tour de Ski skiers